Raymond "Ray" Slocum (16 August 1936 – 14 November 2013) was an Australian rules footballer who played for Fitzroy in the Victorian Football League (VFL).

Football
Recruited locally, Slocum developed into a wingman after being used initially as a rover and at half forward. 

On 6 July 1963, he was the 20th man for the young and inexperienced Fitzroy team that comprehensively and unexpectedly defeated Geelong, 9.13 (67) to 3.13 (31) in the 1963 Miracle Match.

Coach
After retiring he became coach of the Fitzroy reserves and filled in as senior coach for a match against Hawthorn in the 1968 VFL season. He would later coach Eltham and steered them to the 1972 Diamond Valley Football League premiership.

See also
 1963 Miracle Match

Notes

References
 Holmesby, Russell and Main, Jim (2007). The Encyclopedia of AFL Footballers. 7th ed. Melbourne: Bas Publishing.

External links

1936 births
2013 deaths
Australian rules footballers from Victoria (Australia)
Fitzroy Football Club players
Fitzroy Football Club coaches
Eltham Football Club coaches